Radulović, Radulovich is a Serbo-Croatian surname, derived from the male given name Radul or Radule. It may refer to:

Barbara Radulović (born 1982), Croatian TV host
Bojana Radulović (born 1973), Hungarian former handball player
Branko Radulović (born 1881), Bosnian-born Serbian painter
Dragan Radulović (born 1969), Montenegrin writer, literary reviewer and essayist
Jovan Radulović (born 1951), Serbian writer
Milan Radulović (born 1948), the Serbian Minister of Religion
Milan Radulović (footballer), footballer
Milo Radulovich (born 1926), 
Mileta Radulović (born 1981), Montenegrin football goalkeeper
Nemanja Radulović (born 1985), Franco-Serbian violinist
Nenad Radulović (born 1959), Serbian rock musician
Nikola Radulović (born 1973), Italian basketball player and Olympic silver medallist
Niccolò Radulovich (born 1627), a Roman Catholic cardinal
Nina Radulović (born 1986), Serbian television presenter
Radoslav Radulović (born 1972), professional Bosnian Serb football player
Saša Novak Radulović (born 1964), Croatian guitarist
Sasa Radulovic (architect), award-winning Canadian architect
Sasa Radulovic (born 1978), Bosnian-Australian footballer
Saša Radulović, Serbian politician and Canadian businessman
Savo Radulović, (born 1911),Serbian American painter
Zdravko Radulović (born 1966), retired Montenegrin-born Croatian basketball player

See also
Radulov, variant
Raduljica

Serbian surnames
Montenegrin surnames